The Chief Master at Arms House is a historic site in DeLand, Florida, United States. It is located at 910 Biscayne Boulevard. The building is the home of the DeLand Naval Air Station Museum.  On February 15, 2002, it was added to the United States National Register of Historic Places.

References

External links
 Volusia County listings at National Register of Historic Places
 DeLand Naval Air Station Museum at Florida's Office of Cultural and Historical Programs

Houses on the National Register of Historic Places in Volusia County, Florida
DeLand, Florida